Rahmans are, according to Ukrainian popular beliefs, a mythical nation of righteous Christians.

Neopagans think that Rahmans is the allusion to the Indian caste of Brahmins.

Romanian name 

The etymology of the word blajini is the slavonian blažĕnŭ meaning kind, well-minding person.

Rahmanish Easter 

Following the Orthodox Christian calendar, Romanians from Banat, Transylvania, Bukovina and Maramureș regions celebrate the Rahmanish Easter on the first Monday after St. Thomas Sunday. The Rahmanish Easter is called also Easter of Deaths or Mighty Easter.

Ukrainians celebrate the Rahmanish Easter on Mid-Pentecost.

Since Rahmans live in isolation and have no year computation of their own, they have no way of knowing when Easter comes. It is for this reason that Romanians and Ukrainians eat dyed eggs and let the shells flow downstream, from there they believe they will get to the Rahmans. There is a custom in Oster, Lityn, and Lutsk districts to throw egg shells into the river on Easter Eve.

For celebrating the souls of dead relatives or friends, Romanians from the above-mentioned regions prepare festive meals and offer them, in the cemetery, nearby the tombs, after the religious mass and benediction, to all who wished to commemorate and pay their respects to the dead. They cheer up in memory of the deceased.

Romanian beliefs 

They are described as anthropomorphic and short, sometimes having the head of a rat. They are either described as malicious or as having great respect for God and leading a sinless life. They are considered to fast the year through, and thus doing humans a great service.

Blajin also means a dead child who did not receive the benediction of Holy Spirit. The ethnograph Marian Simion Florea wrote : Blajini are fictitious beings, incarnations of dead children not baptized who live at the end of Earth, nearby The Holy water (of Saturday).
Some explain them as the descendants of Adam's son Seth. Others think that they used to live alongside humans on the earth, but Moses, seeing his people oppressed by them, split the waters and, after he and his people had retreated to safety, poured the waters back onto them, sending them to their current abode.

Ukrainian beliefs 

According to different beliefs, Rahmans dwell underground or live on the Rahmans' island.

References 

Ukrainian mythology
Romanian legendary creatures
Mythological peoples